Schiele may refer to:
 Armand Schiele (born 1967), French Alpen skier
 Bernt Schiele (born 1968), German computer scientist
 Egon Schiele (1890, Tulln an der Donau – 1918, Vienna), Austrian painter
 Egon Schiele – Exzess und Bestrafung (film)
 Egon Schiele: Death and the Maiden (film)
 Egon-Schiele-Museum, Tulln
 Egon Schiele Art Centrum, Český Krumlov
 Music for Egon Schiele, the second LP from the instrumental group Rachel's
 Schiele in Prison, a 1980 British independent film
 Friedrich Michael Schiele (1867, Zeitz – 1913), a Protestant theologian
 Konstanty (Edward) Schiele (1817, Warszawa - 1886)
 Haberbusch i Schiele, a (now defunct) Warsaw-based brewery holding founded in 1846 by Konstanty and Błażej Haberbusch
 Martin Schiele (1870, Groß Schwarzlosen, Altmark - 1939, Zislow), a German politician (DNVP)
 Michael Schiele (1978, Heidenheim), a German footballer
 Oscar Schiele (1889, Halberstadt – 1950), a German freestyle and backstroke swimmer

See also 
 11338 Schiele (1996 TL9), a main-belt asteroid discovered on 1996 by J. Ticha and M. Tichy
 Camp Bud Schiele, Schiele Scout Reservation in Tryon, North Carolina
 (der Fachverlag) Schiele & Schön, a German publisher, founded on 1946 by Otto Schiele and Willi Schön at Berlin
 Schiel
 Schieler
 Schielo, Germany

References 

German-language surnames